Nina Holden is a Norwegian mathematician interested in probability theory and stochastic processes, including graphons, random planar maps, the Schramm–Loewner evolution, and their applications to quantum gravity. She is a Junior Fellow at the Institute for Theoretical Studies at ETH Zurich, and has an accepted a position as an associate professor at the Courant Institute of Mathematical Sciences of New York University beginning in 2021.

Education
As a student at Berg Upper Secondary School in Oslo, Norway, Holden became the first woman to win the Abel competition, Norway's national Mathematical Olympiad. She competed in 2005 in the International Mathematical Olympiad, where she earned an honorable mention with one of the two top scores on the Norwegian team.

She became a student at the University of Oslo in Norway, where she earned a bachelor's degree in mathematics and computational science in 2008 and a master's degree in applied mathematics in 2010. While a student in Oslo, she also visited the University of Oxford from 2006 to 2007.

After three years of work as an energy market analyst, she went to the Massachusetts Institute of Technology for graduate study, and completed her Ph.D. there in 2018. Her dissertation, Cardy embedding of random planar maps and a KPZ formula for mated trees, was supervised by Scott Sheffield.

Recognition
In association with the 2021 Breakthrough Prizes, Holden was awarded one of three 2021 Maryam Mirzakhani New Frontiers Prizes, for early-career achievements by a woman mathematician. The citation reads: "for work in random geometry, particularly on Liouville Quantum Gravity as a scaling limit of random triangulations." The particular work refers to her joint work with Xin Sun on the convergence of uniform triangulations under a conformal embedding. The other two winners of the prize were Urmila Mahadev and Lisa Piccirillo.

References

External links
Home page at ETH Zurich

Year of birth missing (living people)
1980s births
Living people
Norwegian mathematicians
Women mathematicians
University of Oslo alumni
New York University faculty
Probability theorists